Second sergeant is typically a non-commissioned officer rank, used in many countries.

Singapore
Second Sergeant is a specialist rank in the Singapore Armed Forces. Second sergeants are rank above third sergeants, but below first sergeants. The rank insignia for a second sergeant features the three chevrons pointing down shared by all specialists, and one chevron pointing up.

In combat units, second sergeants usually hold the appointment of platoon sergeant. They are often given instructional billets as well. Third sergeants may be promoted to the rank of 'local second sergeant', holding this local rank only for the conscript period of their active national service, i.e. more responsibilities but without any extra NS allowance compensation. After ORD, the local promotion will not carry over to conscripts' reservist cycle.

Gallery

See also
 Sergeant
 First sergeant
 Third sergeant

References

Military ranks of Singapore